Yevgeny Viktorovich Prigozhin (born 1 June 1961) is a Russian oligarch and a close confidant of Russian president Vladimir Putin. Prigozhin is sometimes called "Putin's chef", because he owns restaurants and catering companies that provide services for the Kremlin.

Once a convict in the Soviet Union, Prigozhin now controls a network of influential companies including the Russian state-backed mercenary company Wagner Group and three companies accused of interference in the 2016 and 2018 U.S. elections. According to a 2022 investigation by Bellingcat, The Insider, and Der Spiegel, Prigozhin's activities "are tightly integrated with Russia's Defence Ministry and its intelligence arm, the GRU". 

After years of denying his links to Wagner, he eventually confirmed that he was its founder on 26 September 2022. He stated that he founded it in May 2014, to support Russian forces in the war in Donbas. This admission was prompted by a viral video in which Prigozhin was shown in a Mari El prison recruiting inmates, promising them freedom if they served six months with the Wagner Group.

Prigozhin has long denied his role in Russian interference in U.S. elections. In November 2022, he admitted his role in such operations, saying they would continue. In February 2023, he stated he was the founder and long-time manager of Internet Research Agency, a Russian company accused of online propaganda operations.

Prigozhin, his companies, and associates face economic sanctions and criminal charges in the United States, and in the United Kingdom he remains a designated person under sanctions. The FBI is offering a reward of up to $250,000 for information leading to the arrest of Prigozhin.

Early life
Prigozhin was born and raised in Leningrad (now Saint Petersburg) in the Soviet Union on 1 June 1961, to Violetta Prigozhina. His father died early, and so his mother supported him and his sick grandmother by working at a local hospital. His father and stepfather were of Jewish descent.

During his school years, Prigozhin aspired to be a professional cross-country skier. He was trained by his stepfather Samuil Zharkoy, who was an instructor in the sport, and attended a prestigious athletics boarding school from which he graduated in 1977. However, his career in sport was ultimately unsuccessful.

In November 1979, 18-year-old Prigozhin was caught stealing and given a suspended sentence. Two years later, in 1981, he was again caught stealing, and sentenced to twelve years imprisonment for robbery, fraud, and involving teenagers in crime. He and several accomplices were convicted of robbing apartments in upscale neighborhoods. He was pardoned in 1988, and was released in 1990. In total, he spent nine years in detention.

Early career and rise to prominence

After his release from prison in 1990, Prigozhin began selling hot dogs alongside his mother and stepfather in the Aprashaka flea market of Leningrad. Soon, according to a New York Times interview with him, "the rubles were piling up faster than his mother could count them." After the collapse of the Soviet Union, Prigozhin followed the entrepreneurial spirit of the times and founded or became involved in many new businesses.

From 1991 to 1997, Prigozhin was heavily involved in the grocery store business. He became 15% stakeholder and manager of Contrast, which was the first grocery store chain in Saint Petersburg and founded by his former classmate Boris Spektor.

Around the same time, Prigozhin became involved in the gambling business. Spektor and Igor Gorbenko brought Prigozhin on as CEO of Spectrum CJSC (Russian: ЗАО «Спектр»), which founded the first casinos in Saint Petersburg. This trio went on to found many other businesses together throughout the 1990s across various industries, including construction, marketing research, and foreign trade. The Novaya Gazeta notes that this may be when Prigozhin met Vladimir Putin for the first time, as Putin was chairman of the supervisory board for casinos and gambling since 1991. 

In 1995, Prigozhin entered the restaurant business. When revenues of his other businesses began to fall, Prigozhin persuaded a director at Contrast, Kiril Ziminov, to open a restaurant with him. They opened Prigozhin's first restaurant: Old Customs House in Saint Petersburg. In 1997, they founded a second restaurant, New Island, a floating restaurant that became one of the most fashionable dining spots in the city. Inspired by waterfront restaurants on the Seine in Paris, Prigozhin and Ziminov created the restaurant by spending US$400,000 to remodel a rusting boat on the Vyatka River. He said his patrons "wanted to see something new in their lives and were tired of just eating cutlets with vodka." In 2001, Prigozhin personally served food to Vladimir Putin and French president Jacques Chirac when they dined at New Island. He hosted US President George W. Bush in 2002. In 2003, Putin celebrated his birthday at New Island.

Over the course of the 2000s, Prigozhin grew closer with Vladimir Putin. By 2003, he left his business partners and established his own independent restaurants. Notably, one of Prigozhin's companies, Concord Catering, began winning numerous government contracts. He received hundreds of millions in government contracts for feeding school children and government workers. In 2012, he received a contract to supply meals to the Russian military worth US$1.2 billion over one year. Some of the profits from this contract are alleged to have been used to start and fund the Internet Research Agency. 

On 11 December 2018, a company claimed to be unaffiliated with Concord Catering called Msk LLC was paid 2.5 million rubles for an annual "Heroes of the Fatherland Day" banquet held at the Kremlin. However, Msk LLC shares the same contact phone number with Concord. On 11 December 2019, the company received another 4.1 million rubles for another banquet.

In 2012, he moved his family into a Saint Petersburg compound with a basketball court and a helicopter pad. By this point he owned a private jet and a 115-foot yacht Prigozhin has been linked to several aircraft since, including two Cessna 182s and the Embraer Legacy 600, British Aerospace 125 and Hawker 800XP jets.

The Anti-Corruption Foundation has accused Prigozhin of corrupt business practices. In 2017, they estimated his illegal wealth to be worth more than one billion rubles. Alexei Navalny alleged that Prigozhin was linked to a company called Moskovsky Shkolnik (Moscow schoolboy) that had supplied poor quality food to Moscow schools, which had caused a 2019 dysentery outbreak.

Wagner Group

Prigozhin is the self-reported founder of the controversial Kremlin-affiliated private military contractor Wagner Group. On 26 September 2022, Prigozhin stated that he founded the Wagner Group specifically to support Russian forces in the war in Donbas, in May 2014. Since then, their activities have expanded to cover many regions in Africa and the Middle East.

Even before his confirmation, there was already relative consensus amongst Russian and foreign media that Prigozhin was either the founder of or strongly linked to Wagner. The group was publicly led by Dmitry Utkin, who was once head of security for Prigozhin. A person by the name of Dmitry Utkin was also listed as director general of Prigozhin's Concord Management. Concord and Prigozhin denied any connection to Wagner, but in November 2016 the company confirmed to Russian media that the same Dmitry Utkin leading the Wagner Group was now in charge of Prigozhin's food businesses. 

In February 2018, Wagner attacked US-backed Kurdish forces in Syria in an attempt to take an oil field. During the retaliatory air strike by US armed forces, 10-100 of its mercenaries were killed.

In July 2018, three Russian journalists working for a news organization often critical of the Russian government were murdered in the Central African Republic, where they had been attempting to investigate the activities of the Wagner Group in that country. The Russian government had begun a collaboration with the president of the Central African Republic in October 2017. In its response to the killings, Russia's foreign ministry stressed that the dead journalists had been traveling without official accreditation.

Involvement in the 2022 Russian invasion of Ukraine 
Wagner has also played a significant role during and prior to the 2022 Russian invasion of Ukraine. Prigozhin even travelled to the Donbas to personally oversee the group's progress. He was pictured at the frontline wearing military fatigues alongside Russian Duma member Vitaly Milonov.

In August 2022, Wagner Group began using billboards to recruit new members in Russia. Former journalist and observer of the Group, Denis Korotkov said "It looks like they have decided that they will no longer try to hide their existence."

In September 2022, a leaked video exposed Prigozhin attempting to recruit convicts to bolster the Russian forces on the front lines in the war against Ukraine. He said to the convicts "nobody goes back behind bars" and to those uncomfortable with the idea "it's either prisoners or your children – you decide". While the video was filmed at a penal colony in Yoshkar-Ola to recruit shock troops, there is evidence that convicts from a penal colony in Saint Petersburg had been recruited previously. 

On the 26th of September, Prigozhin walked back his previous claims that he had no connection with the group, releasing a statement on the Russian social media website VK wherein he admitted that he had founded it in May 2014 to "protect the Russians" when "the genocide of the Russian population of Donbas began." He explained that he played a personal role from the start, claiming that he "found specialists who could help" after "[cleaning] the old weapons and [sorting out] the bulletproof vests" himself. He confirmed allegations, previously denied by the Russian government, that the group had been involved in other countries aligned with Russian overseas interests, stating that the Wagner mercenaries who "defended the Syrian people, other people of Arab countries, destitute Africans and Latin Americans have become the pillars of our motherland".

On 1 October 2022, he said about the commanders of the Russian army that "All these bastards ought to be sent to the front barefoot with just a submachine gun." He called members of the Putin-controlled Russian parliament "useless" and said that the "deputies should go to the front", adding that "Those people who have been talking from tribunes for years need to start doing something." The Washington Post reported that Prigozhin was one of the few people who dared to tell Putin about the "mistakes" of Russian military commanders in the war in Ukraine.

He praised the Ukrainian defenders of Bakhmut, saying that "Our units are constantly meeting with the most fierce enemy resistance, and I note that the enemy is well prepared, motivated, and works confidently and harmoniously."

On 13 November 2022, Wagner Group released a video depicting its mercenaries using a sledgehammer to execute a deserter who had reportedly been returned to the Russians in a prisoner exchange. Prigozhin commented, "It seems to me that this film should be called: 'A dog dies a dog's death'." "It was an excellent directional piece of work, watched in one breath. I hope no animals were harmed during filming."

Africa interests
Throughout 2018, Prigozhin established numerous interests in Africa via the Wagner Group and approximately 100-200 political consultants. He became involved in such countries as Madagascar, the Central Africa Republic (CAR), the Democratic Republic of the Congo, Angola, Senegal, Rwanda, Sudan, Libya, Guinea, Guinea-Bissau, Zambia, Zimbabwe, Kenya, Cameroon, Côte d'Ivoire, Mozambique, Nigeria, Chad, South Sudan, and South Africa. Pyotr Bychkov is allegedly responsible for coordinating Prigozhin's "Africa expansion". According to a 20 April 2018 Kommersant article, Yaroslov Ignatovsky (born 1983, Leningrad) heads Politgen and is a political strategist that has coordinated the trolls' efforts for Prigozhin in Africa.

In March 2020, it was revealed that Prigozhin had financially assisted Saif al-Islam Gaddafi, son of the late overthrown Libyan leader Muammar Gaddafi, in a bid to win the Libyan presidency in 2019.

Central African Republic
Since early 2018, the Prigozhin-associated company Lobaye Invest has mined diamonds, gold, and other minerals in the prefecture of Lobaye. Faustin-Archange Touadera, the President of the Central African Republic, traveled to Russia in the fall of 2017 to meet with Sergey Lavrov in Sochi and in June 2018 to meet with Vladimir Putin in Saint Petersburg. Touadera's national security advisor Valery Zakharov, Touadera increased the Russian presence in CAR by allowing 5 Russian military advisors and 170 Russian contractors to work starting in January 2018 near Bobangui at Berengo, which is the former palace of Jean-Bédel Bokassa and is 60 kilometres southwest of Bangui. 

Since December 2017, the Kimberley Process allowed diamonds to be mined in the southwest of CAR. Under managing director Evgeny Khodotov who is associated with security for Touadera through the firm Sewa Security Service, Lobaye Invest was founded through M-Invest by Dmitry Syty and is a subsidiary of M-Finance which were founded by Prigozhin. On the night of 31 July 2018, three Russian journalists, Alexander Rastorguev, Orhan Dzhemal, and Kirill Radchenko, who were sent by the Mikhail Khodorkovsky-sponsored Investigation Management Center (SDG), were killed north of Sibut while they were investigating the operations of Lobaye Invest and Russians interests in the east of CAR at the Ndassima gold field for an upcoming film. 

On 15 April 2019, Putin sent 30 Russian troops as part of a UN mission in the CAR to support Lobaye Invest interests. Beginning 18 December 2020, several hundred Russians with heavy weapons supported an offensive on Bangui which included contingents of troops from Rwanda. On 27 May 2021, three Russians were killed when a roadside bomb exploded. From 2012 until May 2021 according to DW, an estimated 800 to 2,000 Russian mercenaries have fought in the CAR.

Internet Research Agency

Prigozhin is alleged to have financed and directed a network of companies including a company called the Internet Research Agency Ltd., Concord Management and Consulting Company and one other related company. The three companies are accused of Internet trolling and attempting to influence the 2016 US presidential elections and other activity to influence political events outside Russia.

Russian journalist Andrey Soshnikov reported that Alexey Soskovets, who had participated in Russian youth political community, was directly connected to the offices of Internet Research in Olgino. His company, North-Western Service Agency, won 17 or 18 (according to different sources) contracts for organizing celebrations, forums and sport competitions for authorities of Saint Petersburg. The agency was the only participant in half of those bids. In the summer of 2013, the agency won a tender for providing freight services for participants of a Seliger camp.

In February 2023, Prigozhin stated that he founded the IRA: "I've never just been the financier of the Internet Research Agency. I invented it, I created it, I managed it for a long time." The admission came months after Prigozhin had admitted to Russian interference in U.S. elections.

Spin offs
Campaigns against opposition in 2013 involved Dmitry Bykov and the then head of RIA Novosti, Svetlana Mironyuk, while a homepage claiming to fight fake news (Gazeta O Gazetah) was used to spread fake news.

International sanctions

In December 2016, the US Treasury Department designated Prigozhin pursuant to E.O.13661 for sanctions for providing support to senior officials of the Russian Federation.

In June 2017, US sanctions were imposed on one of Prigozhin's companies, Concord Management and Consulting, in connection with the war in Eastern Ukraine.

In January 2018, the US Treasury Department also designated Evro Polis Ltd for sanctions. Evro Polis is a Russian company that has contracted with the Government of Syria to protect Syrian oil fields in exchange for a 25 percent share in oil and gas production from the fields. The company was designated for being owned or controlled by Prigozhin. The sanctions require that any property or interests in property of the designated persons in the possession or control of US persons or within the United States must be blocked. Additionally, transactions by US persons involving these persons (including companies) are generally prohibited.

In September 2019, three more Prigozhin companies (Autolex Transport, Beratex Group and Linburg Industries) were sanctioned in connection with the Russian interference in the 2016 United States election.

In February 2022, the Internet Research Agency was added to the European Union sanctions list for running disinformation campaigns to manipulate public opinion and "actively supporting actions which undermine and threaten the territorial integrity, sovereignty and independence of Ukraine."

According to The United States Prigozhin's activities of interfering in elections and subverting public opinion are extended to Asian and African countries. The EU, Canada, United Kingdom, and Australia have also designated him.

US criminal charges

 On 16 February 2018, Prigozhin, the Internet Research Agency, Concord Management, another related company, and other connected Russian individuals were indicted by a US grand jury. He was charged with funding and organizing operations for the purpose of interference with the U.S. political and electoral processes, including the 2016 presidential election, and other crimes including identity theft.  Charges against Concord Management were dismissed with prejudice on March 16, 2020.

In February 2021, Prigozhin was added to the wanted list of the Federal Bureau of Investigation (FBI).

In February 2022, the United States imposed visa restrictions and froze assets of Prigozhin and his family, due to the 2022 Russian invasion of Ukraine.

In July 2022, the U.S. State Department offered a reward of up to $10 million for information about Prigozhin, the Internet Research Agency, and other entities involved in 2016 U.S. election interference.

On 7 November 2022, Prigozhin said he had interfered in U.S. elections and would continue to interfere in the future.

Financial support for Maria Butina in 2019
During May 2019, Maria Butina (charged with acting in the United States as an agent of a foreign government; specifically the Russian Federation) appealed for help in paying her lawyer fees. In February 2019 Valery Butin, Butina's father, told Izvestia that she owed her U.S. attorneys 40 million rubles ($US 659,000). Through Prigozhin's Fund for the Protection of National Values, which is managed by Petr Bychkov, 5 million rubles were donated to Butina's defence lawyer costs.

Personal life and family
Prigozhin is married to Lyubov Valentinovna Prigozhina, a pharmacist and businesswoman. She owns a network of boutique stores known as the Chocolate Museum in Saint Petersburg. In 2012, she started the Crystal Spa & Lounge, a day spa located along Zhukovsky Street in Saint Petersburg, which won a third place award in 2013 for the Perfect Urban Day Spa. She owns a wellness center in the Leningrad region and a boutique hotel called the Crystal Spa & Residence which won the Perfect Spa Project award in 2013. 

She owns the New Technologies SPA LLC which is located at plot 1, Granichnaya street in Lakhta Park, Sestroretsk, Kurortny District, Saint Petersburg. She is the owner of Agat, part of the Concord group.

The couple has a daughter Polina (Russian: Полина), born 1992, and a son Pavel (Russian: Павел), born in either 1996 or 1998.

Prigozhin's mother, Violetta Prigozhina, is a former doctor and educator, and the current legal owner of Concord Management and Consulting LLC since 2011, Etalon LLC since 2010, and Credo LLC since 2011. 

All above family members were sanctioned by the European Union, the United States, Ukraine, and many other countries due to Prigozhin's involvement in Russia's invasion of Ukraine.

Awards
He was awarded the title of Hero of the Russian Federation in 2022.

He was awarded the 2022 Corrupt Person of the Year by the Organized Crime and Corruption Reporting Project.

See also
Elena Khusyaynova
Timeline of Russian interference in the 2016 United States elections
Timeline of investigations into Trump and Russia (January–June 2018)
Arkan

Notes

References

External links

1961 births
Living people
Businesspeople from Saint Petersburg
Criminals from Saint Petersburg
Russian criminals
Russian restaurateurs
Russian mercenaries
Russian nationalists
Russian oligarchs
Russian propagandists
Russian people of Jewish descent
Anti-Ukrainian sentiment in Russia
People of the Wagner Group
Pro-Russian people of the war in Donbas
People of the 2022 Russian invasion of Ukraine
Fugitives wanted by the United States
Russians associated with interference in the 2016 United States elections
Russian individuals subject to the U.S. Department of the Treasury sanctions
Russian individuals subject to European Union sanctions
Heroes of the Russian Federation
Recipients of the Order "For Merit to the Fatherland", 4th class
Recipients of the Medal of the Order "For Merit to the Fatherland" I class
Recipients of the Medal of the Order "For Merit to the Fatherland" II class
20th-century Russian businesspeople
21st-century Russian businesspeople
20th-century Russian criminals
21st-century Russian criminals